The Women's downhill competition at the 2015 World Championships was held on Friday, February 6.

Slovenia's Tina Maze won the gold medal, Anna Fenninger of Austria took the silver, and the bronze medalist was Lara Gut of Switzerland.

Results
The race started at 11:00 MST (UTC−7).

References

Women's downhill
2015 in American women's sports
FIS